VGX-1027 (GIT-27) is a drug which acts as an immunomodulator. It acts by blocking downstream signalling of the Toll-like receptors TLR2, TLR4 and TLR6, and thereby reducing production of various cytokines, including interleukins and TNF-α. In animal studies it has antiinflammatory effects and has been investigated for conditions such as arthritis and lung inflammation.

References 

Isoxazolines
Immunomodulating drugs
Carboxylic acids